Pittsburg is an unincorporated community in Greenwood County, South Carolina, United States.

Unincorporated communities in Greenwood County, South Carolina
Unincorporated communities in South Carolina